Geoff Gamble (born March 11, 1977) is a Canadian professional soccer referee and is a member of the Professional Referee Organization. He officiates in Major League Soccer in the United States and Canada.

Career 
Gamble began officiating at the youth level in the Niagara Soccer Association. In 2009. the Canadian Soccer Association (CSA) named him to the Canada National List of Referees. In 2010, he was named the Canadian Soccer League (CSL) Referee of the Year. He made his Major League Soccer debut on May 21, 2011. In 2013, he began officiating in the North American Soccer League. On May 30, 2019 he was involved in a match between Chicago Fire FC and D.C. United as a video assistant referee, where he was blamed for the allowance of a controversial call.

Personal life 

Gamble attended Brock University where he earned a Bachelor of science degree in Biology. He is also employed as a chiropractor for the Niagara Heath and Rehab center.

References 
 

1977 births
Living people
Sportspeople from St. Catharines
Canadian soccer referees
Major League Soccer referees
North American Soccer League referees
Soccer people from Ontario
Brock University alumni